Isaac G. Bryan is an American politician serving as a member of the California State Assembly from the 55th district, which includes much of South Central Los Angeles. Bryan was previously the executive director of the University of California Los Angeles's Black Policy Project, head of the Public Policy Division for the Million Dollar Hoods Project, and served as the Director of Public Policy for the UCLA Ralph J. Bunche Center.

Early life and education 
Isaac Bryan was born in Dallas, Texas to a teenage mother in poverty who gave him up at birth. Bryan was adopted as an infant and has lived in California since he was in the sixth grade. His family served as a foster family for hundreds of children over two decades and adopted him and eight others from the child welfare system.

Bryan attended seven public schools and two California community colleges before earning a Bachelor of Arts in political science and sociology from the University of Arizona. He worked as a research fellow for the Rombach Institute on Crime, Delinquency and Corrections. During his time with the Rombach Institute, Bryan worked on juvenile justice and criminal justice reform. He also worked with a team of federal monitors to enforce a United States Department of Justice Consent Decree with the Maricopa County Sheriff's Office.

Bryan went on to earn a Master of Public Policy from UCLA Luskin School of Public Affairs. In 2017, Bryan was named a David Bohnett Foundation fellow, where Bryan previously served in  Los Angeles Mayor Eric Garcetti's Office of Reentry, where he co-authored the city's first report on the holistic needs of Angelenos with justice system involvement.

Career

UCLA Black Policy Project 
Bryan is the founding director of UCLA's Black Policy Project (BPP). The BPP aims to build connections between black scholarship at UCLA and public policy decision making. Bryan also serves as director of Public Policy for UCLA's Ralph J. Bunche Center for African American Studies. Bryan also serves as director of public policy for the Million Dollar Hoods (MDH) Project which seeks to map the costs of Mass incarceration in Los Angeles and the United States broadly.

During his time at UCLA, Bryan has authored numerous studies and reports. Bryan and MDH issued several reports on the interactions between students and Los Angeles School Police Department. Bryan regularly provides media commentary on issues of racial inequality in the United States. During the summer of 2020, after the murder of George Floyd, Bryan led peaceful protests in Los Angeles.

Criminal justice reform 
Bryan was one of the leading scholars who articulated that "defunding police" was really a call to question the size of our tax contributions to policing and criminalization at the expense of social services. Bryan was the co-chair for Los Angeles County's Measure J, which was approved by over 2.1 million voters and diverts at least 10% of the county's general funds "to address the disproportionate impact of racial injustice through community investment and alternatives to incarceration". Bryan regularly writes and provides commentary on policing and criminal justice reform in the United States.

Bryan also served as a Commissioner on the Los Angeles Unified School District task force that was convened to study how to reinvest the money cut from the school police budget.

California State Assembly

Election 
In 2021, Bryan announced that he would be a candidate for the California Assembly to succeed fellow Democrat Sydney Kamlager, who was elected to the California Senate. Bryan had served as a senior adviser to Assemblymember Kamlager. Bryan's campaign for the Assembly was endorsed by Sydney Kamlager, Holly Mitchell, Karen Bass, Mike Bonin, Michael Tubbs, Patrisse Cullors, Sophia Bush, and Susan Burton, among others.

Bryan won the special election to represent the 54th district and was sworn into office.

References

External links
Join California Isaac G. Bryan

1992 births
Living people
University of Arizona alumni
University of California, Los Angeles alumni
University of California, Los Angeles faculty
African-American state legislators in California
Democratic Party members of the California State Assembly
Politicians from Los Angeles
American anti-racism activists
African-American academics
Activists for African-American civil rights
21st-century American politicians
21st-century African-American politicians